The Grand Falls-Windsor Cataracts are a senior ice hockey team based in Grand Falls-Windsor, Newfoundland and Labrador and a member of the Central Division of the Newfoundland Senior Hockey League.

Since it was founded in 1966, the Cataracts hockey club has been awarded the Herder Memorial Trophy eight times as all-Newfoundland senior hockey champions, including three consecutive championships from 2014 to 2016. The Cataracts were awarded the Evening Telegram Trophy on four occasions for finishing first overall in the NSHL regular season.  The Cataracts won the Allan Cup in 2017 in Bouctouche, NB.

The Cataracts have played all their home games at the Joe Byrne Memorial Stadium, formerly known as the Grand Falls Stadium until 1991.

History
The Grand Falls Cataracts were founded in 1966 by a group led by Leo Murphy, Al Dwyer Jr., Jim Temple and Walter Davis and supported by the Cataracts Booster Club whose members were ex-hockey players and hockey fans. The Cataracts joined the Newfoundland Senior Hockey League (NSHL) for the 1966–67 season. The previous papertown entry in the provincial senior league, the Grand Falls Andcos, had folded at the end of the 1964–65 season. Winnipeg native  Nick Mickoski was hired as the Cataracts' first head coach. At the end of the 1967-68 regular season, the Cataracts finished in first place and were awarded the Evening Telegram Trophy. The Cataracts won back-to-back all-Newfoundland senior hockey championships in 1981 and 1982 but did not join the NSHL in 1983–84. The club re-joined the NSHL in 1984–85 to make it a four-team league.

At the end of the 2010–2011 season the Cataracts defeated the Conception Bay North Cee Bee Stars 4–0 in the finals series to win the Herder Memorial Trophy. From 2011 to 2014 the club was part of the re-formed Newfoundland Senior Hockey League. In 2012 Herder finals, the Cataracts were runners-up to the Clarenville Caribous who took the Provincial title.

On March 8, 2015, Cataracts' import Rob Hennigar scored the OT winner to win the CWSHL finals series four-games-to-two. The Cataracts were awarded their second straight all-Newfoundland senior championship and the home town received its thirteenth Herder Memorial Trophy.

The Cataracts won their first Allan Cup on April 15, 2017  in Bouctouche, NB after defeating the Lacombe Generals 7–4 in the final.

Season-by-season record

Note: GP = Games played, W = Wins, L = Losses, T = Ties, OTL = Overtime Losses, Pts = Points, GF = Goals for, GA = Goals against

Note: GP = Games played, W = Wins, L = Losses, T = Ties, OTL = Overtime Losses, Pts = Points, GF = Goals for, GA = Goals against, DNQ = Did not qualify

NSHL = Newfoundland Senior Hockey League (1962-1989) or Newfoundland Senior Hockey League (2011-2014), NSHL-C = Newfoundland Senior Hockey League - Central Division, CBIHL = Central Beothuck Intermediate Hockey League, WCSHL = West Coast Senior Hockey League, CWSHL = Central West Senior Hockey League

Allan Cup results

Current roster

For the current team roster see the Cataracts profile on the league website

Leaders

Team captains
Leo Murphy, 1967–68, 1970–71
Jim Beckman, 1971–72
Al Dwyer, 1973–74
Roger Elliott, 1980-81
Harold Stanley, 1975–76
Gene Faulkner, 1981-82
Brian Grouchy, 2002–03
Brad Lewis, 2006–13
Mike Brent, 2013–18

Head coaches
Nick Mickoski, 1967–69
Jim Beckman, 1969–70
Jean-Marc Pichette , 1970–73
Leo Murphy, 1973-76 (playing-coach)
Joe Grimes, 1977–78
Al Dwyer Jr., 1978–79
Joe Byrne, 1979–82
Gord Gallant, 1982–83, 1984–85
Alex Faulkner, 1983–84
Tony Grimes. 1983-84
Mike Brown, 2002-2003
Barry Manual, 2007–08
Walt Lewis, 2008–09
Paul Glavine, 2009–10
Brian Casey, 2010–12
Shane Lukinchuk, 2012–15
Tom Coolen, 2015–17
Pat Yetman , 2017–19

Team awards

Team MVP
(Cataracts most valuable player in the regular season)
Tyler Whitehead, 2011
Cam Fergus, 2016

James "Bucky" Hannaford Jr. Award
(Awarded to the player who shows dedication to the team both on and off the ice)
Mike Brent, 2011
Sam Hounsell, 2013
Nicklas Lindstrom, 2016
Nicklas Lindstrom, 2017

The Cohen's Cup
(Awarded to the Cataract receiving the most points on 3-Star selection during the regular season)
Andre Gill, 2012–13
Andre Gill, 2013–14
Cam Fergus, 2014–15
Mike Brent, 2015–16
Danny Wicks, 2016–17
Danny Wicks, 2017–18
A.J. Whiffen, 2018–19

League trophies and awards
First place in the West Coast senior Hockey League: 2011
First place in the Central West Senior Hockey League: 2016
CWSHL championship: 2015, 2016

League individual awards

League MVP (in the regular season)
Cam Fergus, 2016
Collin Circelli, 2017

Top Scorer (in the regular season)
Cam Fergus, 2016

Top goal scorer (in the regular season)
Chad Earle, 2011
Cam Fergus, 2016

Coach of the Year (in the regular season)
Brian Casey, 2011
Tom Coolen, 2016
Tom Coolen, 2017

Top Goalie (in the regular season)
A.J. Whiffen, 2016
Bryan Gillis, 2017
A.J. Whiffen, 2019

Top Defenseman (in the regular season)
Luke Gallant, 2016
Nick Lindstrom, 2019

Rookie of the Year (in the regular season)
Chad Earle, 2011

Hockey NL (HNL) Trophies and Awards

HNL team awards
Eight all-Newfoundland senior hockey championships (Herder Memorial Trophy): 1971, 1972, 1981, 1982, 2011, 2014, 2015, 2016
First place in Newfoundland Senior Hockey League (Evening Telegram Trophy): 1968, 1972, 1981, 2014

HNL individual awards

S. E Tuma Memorial Trophy (Top scorer in the regular season)
Charlie Greene, 1975
Gene Faulkner, 1976
Dennis Goulding, 1977
Bruce Campbell, 1982
Ron Hennigar, 2014

T.A. (Gus) Soper Memorial Award (Most valuable player in the Senior "A" leagues in the regular season)
Jason Stone, 2006
A.J. Whiffen, 2013
Ron Hennigar, 2014
Cam Fergus, 2016

Albert "Peewee" Crane Memorial Trophy (Senior league rookie of the year)
Terry French, 1969
Don Howse, 1972
Brandon Nicholas, 2008
Chad Earle, 2011

Howie Clouter Memorial Trophy (Most Gentlemanly and Effective Player in the regular season)
Al Dwyer Jr., 1974, 1975
Dan Flynn, 1981
Bruce Campbell, 1982
Troy Thompson, 2006
Andre Gill, 2010
Danny Wicks, 2018
Danny Wicks, 2019

President's Goaltender's Award (Top goaltender in the regular season)
Fred Janes, 1968, 1969
Jean-Guy Morissette, 1972
Rocky Martin, 1973
Eddie Davis, 1982
Mark Yetman, 2012
A.J. Whiffen, 2013
A.J. Whiffen, 2014
A.J. Whiffen, 2016
A.J. Whiffen, 2019

Top Defenseman (Top defenseman in the regular season)
Rodi Short, 2014
Luke Gallant, 2016

Coach of the Year
Shane Lukinchuk, 2014
Tom Coolen, 2016

Cliff Gorman Memorial Award (Most valuable player of the Herder Playoffs)
A.J. Whiffen, 2014
Cam Fergus, 2015
Luke Gallant, 2016

Honoured members
Note: (the year honoured is noted)

Retired numbers
 #7 Al Dwyer Jr.
 #12 Jim Temple
 #8 Gene Faulkner (2011)
 #55 Martin Lapointe (2015)
 #16 Clar Goulding (2017)
 # Wayne Faulkner (2017)
 # James "Bucky" Hannaford (2018)
 # Cec Thomas (2018)

Honoured Builders
 Walter Davis (2018)

NL Hockey Hall of Fame
The following people associated with the Cataracts have been inducted into the Newfoundland and Labrador Hockey Hall of Fame.
Note: (the year of induction is noted)
Alex Faulkner (1994)
Joe Byrne (1995)
Allan Dwyer Jr. (1996)
Walt Davis (1999)
Leo Murphy (1999)
Harold Stanley (2000)
Don Howse (2000)
Jim Temple (2001)
Gene Faulkner (2001
Harry Katrynuk (2007)
Clarence Goulding (2008)
Allan Bargery (2009)
Wayne Faulkner (2013)
Cecil Thomas (2018)

References

Bibliography

External links
 Team website
 League website

Ice hockey in Newfoundland and Labrador
Ice hockey teams in Newfoundland and Labrador
Grand Falls-Windsor
1966 establishments in Newfoundland and Labrador
Ice hockey clubs established in 1966
Senior ice hockey teams